Kinmen Daily News (KMDN) is a newspaper owned by Kinmen County Government in Kinmen County (Quemoy), Fujian Province, Republic of China (Taiwan).

History
The predecessor of the Kinmen Daily News was Chunghwa Cheng Chi Pao (Zhōnghuá-zhèngqìbào) from Nancheng, Jiangxi, which retreated to Quemoy following the Chinese civil war. Kinmen Daily News started publishing on October 31, 1965. From November 7, 1992 onwards, the operation of two newspapers were split. Chunghwa Cheng Chi Pao was changed into a weekly paper, and is distributed to the military on Quemoy. Kinmen Daily News was transferred to the Kinmen County Government, and continued to be published daily.

The Kinmen Daily News has been criticized as being used to support incumbent county magistrates in their campaigns for reelection.

See also
 Media of Taiwan
 Matsu Daily

References

1965 establishments in Taiwan
Publications established in 1965
Newspapers published in Taiwan